Pedreiras may refer to the following places:

Pedreiras, Maranhão, in Brazil
Pedreiras (Porto de Mós), a parish in the municipality of Porto de Mós, in Portugal

See also

Pedreira (disambiguation)